Pseudalcantarea grandis, synonym Tillandsia grandis, is a species of flowering plant in the family Bromeliaceae. This species is native to Mexico, Guatemala, and  Honduras.

References

Tillandsioideae
Flora of Mexico
Flora of Guatemala
Flora of Honduras
Plants described in 1845